Umaria Binthy Ayesha Sinhawansa (born 5 January 1991), popularly as Umaria Sinhawansa, is a Sri Lankan pop, R&B and jazz singer. She is the youngest musician to be ever awarded A-Grade by Sri Lanka Broadcasting Corporation. She has won the 'Kala Keerthi Abhimani' award for her contribution to Sri Lanka's music industry. Umaria began her music career at age 11 in the 2005, performing with her sister at various stages. She made her debut as a playback singer in the film Asai Man Piyabanna. And also she has won silver awards at Pan Asia Music International Music Competition and the Crimea Music Fest international competition.

In 2020, her single "Manda Pama" was a super hit in Sri Lanka and reached 10 million views in a very short time. She was listed among the most viewed female artists on YouTube with 22 million views. And she is the most followed Sri Lanka singer on Instagram. She received "Aya Pranama Award" for her contribution to the music and was awarded the 2021 SLIM-Nielsen Peoples Awards for the song of the year 2021.

Early life and education
Umaria Sinhawansa was born 5 January 1991, in Colombo, Sri Lanka. She is the daughter of Tony Sinhawansa and Ayesha Sinhawansa who were musicians and Umaria was exposed to music early in her life. Umaria studied at Muslim Ladies College and Gateway International school, Colombo, Sri Lanka. She graduated BA Honours degree In Music and She has diploma in Interior Designing and Videography. She has two older brothers, Subandrio, and Hharthono. Hharthono is also a music producer & entrepreneur. Her older sister Umara Sinhawansa is also a musician. Umaria's grandmother Rani Perera, was an actress in Sri Lankan cinema. She is also a granddaughter of the late songstress and actress Rukmani Devi.

Career

Beginning
By age 11, Umaria became serious about pursuing a music career, where she performed with her sister Umara for a large audience and that was her entry into the professional music industry. When she was in school, she learned to sing Arabic. Then she did few songs with Sri Lankan music producer Sri Shyamalangan. She later joined with popular music duo Bathiya and Santhush (BnS) for a song of the Arabic genre which is called Shaheena. After the song, she collaborated with BnS again for the film playback Pathu Pem Pathum for the film Asai Man Piyabanna. The song became a super hit and made her turning point of the career. In 2007, she became the youngest singer to  ever be nominated for the Best Female Playback Singer at Sarasaviya Awards. Then she voiced for films, TV commercials, and teledrama theme songs. In 2009, she voiced the theme song for the television serial Gehenu Lamai. Her second song was "Gum Nade" for the movie Rosa Kele and both songs were commercially successful.

In 2010, at age of 16, Umaria participated in an International Singing Competition, Pan Asia Music Festival 2010 representing Sri Lanka, which was held in Beijing, China. In the competition, she sang "Hello" by Adele and "Listen" by Beyoncé. She later won the first place from semi-finals and she was able to win Silver medal from the whole competition. Then she was invited again to an international competition, which was in Turkey, where she was the only Asian contestant. In that competition, she won the bronze medal. After the competition, a Swedish record label joined with Umaria for many singles. Later she participated in the Crimea Music Fest in Ukraine with her sister. They both did an original song named My Dreams, and they remade the song, Halo by Beyoncé. Later, they won third palace from that competition. In 2010, Sinhawansa had performed on International Indian Film Academy Awards (IIFA Awards) with BnS. She also shared the same stage with Indian musicians, Asha Bhosle and Shankar–Ehsaan–Loy. In 2018, Umaria got honoured by the Indian Prime Minister  Narendra Modi for the song Vaishnav Jana to, a musical tribute to Mahatma Gandhi's 150th Birth Anniversary.

Success
After winning many international competitions, she was back in Sri Lanka, where she joined with the Ashanthi School of Music conducted by Ashanthi De Alwis.
During this period, she featured with Randhir Witana for the song, Mal Madahasa. In 2014 she featured with Devashrie de Silva for the song, Nidahase Inna and many BnS collaborations such as  Kavikariye, Baila Gamuda Remix Karala, Hinipeththata, Hitha Wawannema Na  etc. In 2013, she performed on 2013 Commonwealth Heads of Government Meeting (CHOGM 2013) opening ceremony. In the meantime, she made a duet with prominent musician W. D. Amaradeva, few years before his demise.

In 2015, Umariya made her first original hit, Denuwan Piya. It was produced by BnS and the song was commercially successful. Meanwhile, she became a judge for the singing reality show, Sirasa Superstar. Then she joined with celebrity reality show "Hiru Mega Stars" for the team "Sooryans" along with Yureni Noshika, Himali Sayurangi, Asanka Perera, Pathum Rukshan, Piyumi Botheju and Akila Dhanuddara. In 2017, she joined with the reality program "Youth with Talent - Generation Next" as a guest judge. In 2018, she released a single, Malak Nowe, and then featured with Ruwan Hettiarachchi for the song Hiru Mal Kiniththak Dara. In the same year, she made playback singing for the film Bimba Devi alias Yashodhara. After that song, she became an A-Grade singer at Sri Lanka Broadcasting Corporation. She is the youngest to achieve the feat. Then she collaborated with BnS for the album Oba Nisa and toured for the Oba Nisa concert.

In 2019, she made playback singing for the blockbuster Vijayaba Kollaya, directed by Sunil Ariyaratne. In the same year, she premiered her single, Rangume  on 9 August. On 11 December 2019, she collaborated with BnS and Sanuka Wickramasinghe for the song Saragi Asille. During the pandemic, she performed the first Driving Concert in Sri Lanka. On 3 July 2020, she released the solo "Manda Pama" which was recorded in France. The song reached 2 million views within first two days and later 10 million views on YouTube. The song also ranked number 1# in iTunes and Apple Music in Sri Lanka as well as received international recognition. In November 2020, she joined the coaching panel of the reality show "The Voice Sri Lanka".Umaria is also known for her role as a coach on the televised singing competition The Voice Sri Lanka and She is the winning caoch of the season 2021  In the meantime, on 4 February 2021, she released her next single Yuda Gini Dumaraya as a tribute to war heroes. While working on "The Voice Sri Lanka" competition, she released the song Rathu Eli. She also made cameo appearances in the films Dancing Stars and Spandana.

Artistry and musical influences
Umaria is a light lyric soprano possessing a four-octave vocal range and a whistle register She has  mainly been described as a pop, R&B and jazz singer. Her major Musical influences are her mother and sister.They always encouraged her to sing. And Umaria has cited Whitney Houston , Beyoncé , Celine Dion , Michael Jackson  as her main musical influences.

Discography

Originals

Collaborations

Playback singing

Awards and nominations

Milestones
 A grade award granted by Sri Lanka Broadcasting Corporation
 Youngest artist to be nominated for the Best Singer Award in 2007 and 2008 at the Sarasaviya Film Awards
 Performed on 2013 Commonwealth Heads of Government Meeting (CHOGM 2013) opening ceremony
 Performed on International Indian Film Academy Awards (IIFAA Awards) in 2010 with BnS
 Silver Award winner at the 11th Pan Asia Music Festival
 Bronze award at the original song contest in Izmir Turkey in 2010
 Solo performances in China 2010
 Silver medalist at the Asian Youth Singing competition, China in 2011
 Bronze award (with Umara) at Crimea Music Festival in 2011
 Song of the Year 2021 award at the SLIM-Nielsen Peoples Awards. (Song: Manda Pama)
 Honorary title ‘Kala Keethi Abhimani’ by the All Ceylon Cultural Environment Protection Organization.
 Nominated for the Most Popular Sri Lankan Woman 'Vanithabhimana 2020'.
 Won the Most Popular Sri Lankan Woman 'Vanithabhimana 2021'

Other ventures

Philanthropy and activism
On May 14, 2020, Umaria was involved in a Sri Lankan Government effort to promote COVID-19 Prevention among people in Sri Lanka. She sang the song, Itukama to educate the people how COVID-19 prevention works in Sri Lanka. And she performed with BnS in many apartment complexes following health safety measures, to make people mentally fit during the lockdown with the help of Sri Lankan Government.

She has opened up a social media page, called one promise to talk to people who are struggling with depression and other mental issues.

Brand ambassadorships and endorsements
2015, Umaria signed up for  SLTMobitel  and voiced many songs promoting this networking brand. In 2018, she signed up as brand ambassador for Signal toothpaste and she voiced their brand's theme song, Sina Bo Wewa. Meantime she was a brand ambassador of Sunlight (cleaning product) and She voiced the song Manu dam Viyamana with various artists.

In 2020 Beauty Brand, British Cosmetic sponsored her song, Manda Pama.After the huge success of the song, on 21 November 2020, they announced Umaria as their new, main brand ambassador. She mainly endorses the product Discover the Power of Gold - Prevense Advanced Gold Therapy and many of British cosmetics. After she was named as a brand ambassador with others for the food and drink brand, Nestlé Sri Lanka's Nestamolt campaign. In the meantime,  they released an advertisement showcasing a campaign between the company and Umaria with some of the proceeds going to "organizations that seek to improve people's health as well as mental and emotional well-being. Dialog Axiata signed Umaria as their brand ambassador, for Dialog Fun Blaster campaign and they collaborated with her song Manda Pama. On Mar 12, 2021, the phone brand Oppo announced Umaria as their brand ambassador, she is currently endorsing the OPPO F19 Pro.

References 

21st-century Sri Lankan women singers
1994 births
Living people
People from Colombo
Sri Lankan singer-songwriters
Sri Lankan businesspeople
Sri Lankan YouTubers